Events from the year 1648 in Ireland.

Incumbent
Monarch: Charles I

Events
March – Murrough O'Brien, 1st Earl of Inchiquin changes sides and declares for the King.
September – open breach between Owen Roe O'Neill and Confederate Council.
September – Murrough O'Brien, 1st Earl of Inchiquin welcomes the Marquis of Ormond when he returns to Ireland.

Births
Henry Colley, politician (d. 1719)
Edward Fitzharris, intriguer (d. 1681)

Deaths
Richard Martin fitz Oliver, lawyer, member of the Catholic Confederates of Ireland and Mayor of Galway (b. c. 1602)

References

 
1640s in Ireland
Ireland
Years of the 17th century in Ireland